Kurichi may refer to:

Places
Kurichi, a neighborhood of Coimbatore, Tamil Nadu, India
Kurichi, Salem, a village in Salem district, Tamil Nadu, India
Kurichi, Thanjavur, a village in Thanjavur district, Tamil Nadu, India
Kurichy, a village in Kottayam district, Kerala, India